American Ninja Warrior: Ninja vs. Ninja (formerly Team Ninja Warrior) is an American reality television obstacle racing team competition series and a spin-off of American Ninja Warrior. The series features ANW alumni racing in teams of three against each other, with the winners receiving a cash prize.

History
On October 9, 2015, Esquire Network announced a spin-off of American Ninja Warrior which would feature twenty-four 3-person teams (two men and one woman) of popular ANW alumni. The teams competed head-to-head against each other, running the course simultaneously, thus creating a new live duel dynamic. The two teams with the fastest times advance to the finale where one team will be crowned the winners and receive a cash prize. Matt Iseman and Akbar Gbaja-Biamila host alongside actor and journalist, Alex Curry. The series is Esquire Network's most-watched program in the channel's history.

On May 31, 2016, Esquire Network announced a sixteen-episode second season that will also include a five-episode special college edition that will have college-aged competitors go head-to-head against rival schools.

On March 6, 2017, it was announced that Team Ninja Warrior would be moving to sibling cable channel USA Network as Esquire Network wound down its linear channel operations and relaunched as an online-only service. The show's second season premiered on April 18.

On October 5, 2017, it was announced by USA Network that the show would be retitled American Ninja Warrior: Ninja vs Ninja starting with the show's third season, which premiered on March 1, 2018.

Format
Each first-round episode consists of five matches: two seeding-round matches, two elimination matches (always pitting a seeding-round winner against a seeding-round loser), and the championship relay race. The four standard rounds features three heats, with the captains selecting opponents (men vs. men only), with the women racing against each other. The third heat is worth double points, with an extra race as a tiebreaker in the event of a 2-2 tie, while the relay race takes place on an extended course.

Once the contestant reaches the Dancing Stones, a contestant who fails any of the next obstacles (which alternate) or the Warped Wall (three-attempt rule in play) automatically loses. The player who advanced the furthest wins the heat, with whoever reached the previous obstacle the fastest being the tie-breaker. A ten-second penalty applies for failure to clear obstacles in the relay race, assessed to the next player on the team. In the relay final, the course's additional obstacles are the Salmon Ladder, Tilting Ladder, and conclude with a 30-foot spider climb leading to a 10-foot rope climb.

In contrast to the ANW rules, but like ANW Junior, which state that touching the water is not allowed, competitors are permitted to make contact with the water, but are disqualified if they completely fall or completely lose their grip on the obstacle. For instance, competitors can drag their feet through the pool on the Sonic Swing, but if they fall completely off the rope, they are disqualified. Often competitors will brush the water in an effort to catch up, but their slick feet most commonly hurt them later on obstacles such as the Warped Wall.
 
The newest season in 2018 has 36 teams of three competitors each, with major rule changes to the elimination rounds.

Each race will now be worth one point, again with the only restriction that the women must race each other.  A team must will all three heats to win the round.  If neither team sweeps the heats, the heats will be settled with a relay.  Teams will assign competitors to one of three points, the start, after the second, and after the fourth obstacles.  To win the match, the team up 2-1 must win one heat to win.  If the team down 1-2 wins the heat, the two teams will conduct one sudden death relay to determine the winner.  The winners of the two matches will play in the final, now nine obstacles, using the format except in the relay (used in the fourth and fifth heats if necessary), the exchange points will be after the third and sixth obstacles, respectively. Also, there are no more sudden death matches.

Series overview

Seasons

Season 1 (2016)

The first season of American Team Ninja Warrior occurred in the 2015-2016 TV season. The season was taped from October 21–23, 2015, in Long Beach, California. Of the competing teams, only one team was captained by a woman, that of Jessie Graff's, the "G-Force". Premiering on January 19, 2016, the season consisted of eight, hour-long episodes, exclusively on Esquire Network. The season ended with "Party Time", consisting of members Brian Arnold, Jake Murray, and Jennifer Tavernier crowned Team Ninja Warrior Champions, winning over "TNT", which included members Travis Rosen, Adam Arnold, and Joyce Shahboz.

Ratings

College Madness (2016)

Team Ninja Warrior: College Madness was a five-episode special season that premiered on November 22, 2016, on Esquire Network. Each episode featured teams, each consisting of two men and one woman, competing against other teams from various colleges and universities across the United States. At the end of each episode, the top two teams faced each other in a relay race, with the winner advancing to the finals. Matt Iseman and Akbar Gbaja-Biamila hosted with ANW fan favorite Kacy Catanzaro as the sideline reporter. The tournament was ultimately won by the University of Wisconsin, with a team consisting of Zack Kemmerer, Andrew Philibeck, and Taylor Amann.

Season 2 (2017)

The second season of Team American Ninja Warrior premiered on USA Network on April 18, 2017, with the season finale airing June 27, 2017. There were 28 teams; unlike season 1, in which only one team was captained by a woman, season 2 featured 3 teams captained by women. The season ended with Storm Team, led by Joe Moravsky, being crowned as the new champions, with Travis Rosen's Team TNT finishing runner-up for the second year in a row.

Ratings

Season 3 (2018) 

Season 3 of the show, now dubbed as American Ninja Warrior: Ninja vs. Ninja, premiered on March 1, 2018 with the finale airing on June 18, 2018. The competition was won by the only female-led team, Jesse “Flex” Labreck’s Labreckfast Club.

Ratings

Ratings

Broadcast syndication

The series aired on Esquire Network for Season 1 only in 2016. The second season premiered on USA due to Esquire's shutdown as a TV network, as well as third season premiering in 2018. In addition to American Ninja Warrior Jr., Universal Kids acquired the rights to the series and started airing it in 2019.

Spin-offs

Foreign editions
 Team Ninja Warrior Denmark premiered on 4 September 2016 on Kanal 5.
 Team Ninja Warrior Germany will premiere in 2018 on RTL.

Notes

References

External links
 Website

American television spin-offs
Reality television spin-offs
2010s American game shows
2010s American reality television series
2016 American television series debuts
2018 American television series endings
Ninja vs. Ninja
Ninja Warrior (franchise)
USA Network original programming